Villy Christiansen (born 18 April 1935) is a Danish sprint canoeist who competed in the late 1950s. At the 1956 Summer Olympics in Melbourne, he finished seventh in K-1 1000 m event.

References
Sports-reference.com profile

External links

1935 births
Canoeists at the 1956 Summer Olympics
Danish male canoeists
Living people
Olympic canoeists of Denmark
Place of birth missing (living people)